Christian Szymczak (born March 4, 1974) is an American racecar driver who competed in the Barber Dodge Pro Series in 2001 and 2002, finishing 11th and 8th in points in his two years, respectively.

In 2013 Christian won the SCCA Pro Racing Playboy Mazda MX-5 Cup championship. In 2021, he and co-driver Kenny Murillo won the Silver Cup championship of the GT4 America Series.

Complete motorsports results

American Open-Wheel racing results
(key) (Races in bold indicate pole position, races in italics indicate fastest race lap)

Barber Dodge Pro Series

References

1974 births
Living people
American racing drivers
Barber Pro Series drivers
Michelin Pilot Challenge drivers